USS Wendy (SP-448) was a United States Navy patrol vessel in commission from 1917 to 1918.

Wendy was built as a private motorboat of the same name in 1913 by the Jahncke Navigation Company at New Orleans, Louisiana. On 1 July 1917, the U.S. Navy acquired her from her owner, Mr. C. A Sporl of New Orleans, for use as a section patrol vessel during World War I. She was commissioned at New Orleans as USS Wendy (SP-448) on 3 August 1917.

Wendy carried out patrol duties in the waters around New Orleans for the remainder of World War I.

Wendy  was decommissioned on 9 December 1918 and returned to Sporl the same day.

References

Department of the Navy Naval History and Heritage Command Online Library of Selected Images: U.S. Navy Ships: USS Wendy (SP-448), 1917-1918. Originally the civilian motor boat Wendy (1913)
NavSource Online: Section Patrol Craft Photo Archive: Kanised (SP 448)

Patrol vessels of the United States Navy
World War I patrol vessels of the United States
Ships built in New Orleans
1913 ships